Jake Heyward  (born 26 April 1999) is a Welsh middle-distance runner. He was a silver medalist at the 2022 European Athletics Championships in the 1500m.

Career
Heyward was a European champion at under-18 and under-20 level. He turned professional in 2020 with the Oregon Track Club. Heyward went into the British Athletics Championship and Olympic trials in Manchester with a with a 3:33.99 personal best for the 1,500 metres race, which was below the minimum Olympic standard. He had also broken Neil Horsfield’s 31 year old Welsh record set in Brussels in 1990. On 26 June, 2021 Heyward finished third in the 1,500m at the British championship to secure a place on the British team for the delayed 2020 Summer Games. In Tokyo, despite being hampered by an Achilles injury Heyward came through the heats and semi-finals and came ninth in the final of the 1500m. In 2022, Heyward finished as runner-up in the Fifth Avenue Mile behind three-time winner Jake Wightman. He came fifth in the 1500m race at the 2022 Commonwealth Games 1500m race in a new personal best time of 3:31.08 and then won silver in the 2022 European Athletics Championships – Men's 1500 metres behind Jakob Ingebrigtsen.

References

External links
 

Living people
1999 births
Welsh male middle-distance runners
Sportspeople from Cardiff
Athletes (track and field) at the 2020 Summer Olympics
Olympic athletes of Great Britain
European Athletics Championships medalists